Pain 2 is a debut studio album by American rapper Derez De'Shon. It was released on December 14, 2018, via Commission Music and BMG Rights Management. The album features guest appearances from Yella Beezy, Lil Durk, Lil Baby, Russ, Mozzy, Dreezy, Moneybagg Yo, Trouble and YFN Lucci. Production was handled by London on da Track, Taz Taylor, DJ Chose, CashMoneyAP, Will-A-Fool, and TM88, among others. The album also serves as the second installment of the Pain series, and a sequel to his 2017 Pain mixtape. On December 29, 2018, the album peaked at number 186 on the Billboard 200.

Singles 
The lead single from the album, "Beat The Odds", was released on July 13, 2018. The music video for the song was released on September 6, 2018.

The second single from the album, "Whaddup Doe" featuring American rapper Mozzy, was released on November 16, 2018. The song's music video was released on January 17, 2019.

The third and final single from the album, "By the Scale", was released on December 7, 2018. The music video for the song was released on December 18, 2018.

Commercial performance 
On December 29, 2018, Pain 2 debuted at number 186 on the US Billboard 200 chart, which became Derez's first chart entry. Plus, the album debuted at number 17 on the US Heatseekers Albums and also debuted at number 42 on the US Independent Albums chart.

Track listing 
Credits adapted from Spotify and Tidal.

Personnel 
Credits were adapted from Tidal.

Vocalists
 Derez De'Shon – primary artist
 Yella Beezy – featured artist (track 2)
 Lil Durk – featured artist (track 3)
 Lil Baby – featured artist (track 5)
 Russ – featured artist (track 6)
 Mozzy – featured artist (track 8)
 Dreezy – featured artist (track 10)
 Moneybagg Yo – featured artist (track 11)
 Trouble – featured artist (track 12)
 YFN Lucci – featured artist (track 14)

Production
 Quin with the Keyz – producer (track 1)
 ShunOnDaBeat – producer (track 1)
 DJ Chose – producer (tracks 2–4, 13, 16)
 Taz Taylor – producer (tracks 2, 3, 9, 14)
 Touch of Trent – producer (track 3)
 Will-A-Fool – producer (tracks 4, 7, 11)
 Stoopid Beats – producer (track 5)
 London on da Track – producer (tracks 6, 8, 17)
 YIB – producer (track 7)
 E-Trou – producer (track 9)
 Sidepce – producer (track 9)
 ADP – producer (track 10)
 CashMoneyAP – producer (track 10)
 Beezo – producer (track 12)
 Cassius Jay – producer (track 12)
 Nick Mira – producer (track 14)
 TM88 – producer (track 15)
 KGrayWhatitDo – producer (track 16)

Technical
 Glenn Schick – mastering engineer (tracks 1–7, 9, 10, 12, 13, 15, 16)
 K.Y. – mixing engineer (tracks 1–10, 12, 13, 15–17)
 Dave Kutch – mastering engineer (track 17)

Charts

References 

2018 albums
Hip hop albums by American artists
Albums produced by Taz Taylor (record producer)
Albums produced by TM88
Albums produced by London on da Track
Albums produced by Nick Mira
BMG Rights Management albums